The men's 1500 metres at the 2014 European Athletics Championships took place at the Letzigrund on 15  and 17 August.

Medalists

Records

Schedule

Results

Round 1

First 3 in each heat (Q) and 4 best performers (q) advance to the Semifinals. Soufiane El Kabbouri and David Bustos admitted to the final because damaged by Andreas Vojta.

Final

References

Round 1 Results
Final Results

1500 M
1500 metres at the European Athletics Championships